The Middle Belt (also spelt Middle-Belt or Central Nigeria) is a term used in human geography to designate a belt region stretching across central Nigeria longitudinally and forming a transition zone between Northern and Southern Nigeria. It is composed of the southern half of the defunct Northern Region of Nigeria, now comprising mostly the North Central geopolitical zone, and is characterised by its lack of a clear majority ethnic group. It is also the location of Nigeria's Federal Capital Territory.

The eminence of manifold minority groups, to some degree, constitutes an ethno-linguistic barrier in the country and draws a separation between the principally Muslim North and the mainly Christian south. The region is a convergence of these cultural domains and maintains a tremendous degree of ethno-linguistic diversity. Afro-Asiatic, Nilo-Saharan, and Niger–Congo languages are all spoken, which are three of the primary African language families. In the 1920s, it was described by Melzian (1928:496) as the "Middle Zone".

Overview 
As to what the Middle-Belt entails, three top members of the Middle-Beltern struggle had this to say as presented in the pan-Middle-Beltern magazine, New Vision in December, 2000:

The veteran journalist, Chief Bayo Joseph, Media Consultant and Chairman, Editorial Board of the New Vision, on his own part said: 

On another flash, Onesimus Enesi added that: 

The definition of the Middle Belt areas are subject to great debate due to the presence of significant number of ethnic Hausa, Fulani, Kanuri and Igbo groups . In addition, the Yoruba who are the predominant ethnic group in Kwara and Kogi have a strong affinity with the larger Yoruba body and frequently prefer not to be associated with the Middle Belt identity.

Politics 
States of Nigeria which are generally referred to as belonging to the Middle Belt are: old Plateau (now Plateau and Nasarawa), old Gongola (now Adamawa and Taraba), Niger, Kwara, Kogi, Benue, the Federal Capital Territory, alongside Southern Kaduna, Southern Bauchi, Southern Kebbi, Southern Gombe, Southern Yobe State and Southern Borno, all culturally considered as part of the Middle Belt.

Demographics 
The population of the Middle Belt as of 1991, was about 17.3 million but now predicted to be over 45 million people living in the middle belt region, with a predominant Christian  population of 65%, Muslim population of 25% and Animist population of 10% of the total population.

Ethnolinguistic groups  
The Middle Belt consists of many ethnic groups speaking over 230 languages. There is no dominant ethnic group, but among the larger groups as of 1991 are: Tiv 5.1 million, Nupe 1.8 million. These ethnic groups are represented by advocacy organizations such as CONAECDA.

Ethnoreligious conflicts 
Minorities in Nigeria tend to be dominated by the three largest ethnic groups, the Hausa of the North, the Yoruba of the Southwest and the Igbo of the Southeast. Surrounded by divergent religious, economic, and cultural histories, the Middle Belt has been the melting pot where small and large ethno-religious groups in Nigeria have long coexisted, but where they have also increasingly collided over land, resources, identity and political power. The result is a mixture of recurring conflicts and occasional political unity and solidarity amongst these highly differentiated peoples. An example for the latter was the United Middle Belt Congress that emerged following Nigeria's independence from Britain in 1960. In particular, Jos city in Plateau State has been a centre for ethno-religious disputes and violence since the 1990s. The Jos Forum Inter-Communal Dialogue process spanned 16 months from August 2013 - December 2014, and refers to a peace process undertaken by communities living in Jos that concluded in a “Declaration of Commitment to Peace”. In 2018 violence escalated, with battles for scarce resources leading to over 500 deaths and 50 towns being destroyed. The clashes were largely between Muslim Fulani pastoralists and Christian Berom farmers.  Over 300,000 people have been displaced by the violence.

Towns and villages
 

Kurgwi

See also
 1992 Zangon Kataf crises
 Culture of Northern Nigeria
 Agricultural sustainability in northern Nigeria
 CONAECDA, an organization representing indigenous ethnic groups in the Middle Belt

References

External links
Blench, Roger. 2021. Reconstructing society in central Nigeria prior to 1800. Presented on 12 June 2021.

 
Geography of Nigeria
Demographics of Nigeria
Belt regions
Religion and geography
Regions of West Africa
Cultural boundaries
Religion in Nigeria